Lucia Scardoni (born 22 March 1991) is an Italian cross-country skier. She competed in the women's sprint at the 2018 Winter Olympics. and Women's 10 kilometre classical, at the 2022 Winter Olympics.

Biography
Scardoni grew up in Valdiporro, near Bosco Chiesanuova, the daughter of Roberta, a schoolteacher, and Ivo, a painter and decorator. She followed in the footsteps of her father, who was a keen cross-country skier who competed in long-distance races, including Marcialonga and Vasaloppet. She has been in a relationship with cross-country skier Mattia Pellegrin since 2011: the couple have lived together in Predazzo since 2013.

Cross-country skiing results
All results are sourced from the International Ski Federation (FIS).

Olympic Games

World Championships

World Cup

Season standings

References

External links
 

1991 births
Living people
Italian female cross-country skiers
Olympic cross-country skiers of Italy
Cross-country skiers at the 2018 Winter Olympics
Cross-country skiers at the 2022 Winter Olympics
Sportspeople from Verona
People from Bosco Chiesanuova